The Enigma (born Paul Lawrence) is an American sideshow performer, actor, and musician who has undergone extensive body modification, including horn implants, ear reshaping, multiple body piercings, and a full-body jigsaw-puzzle tattoo. His tattooing process began on December 20, 1992, under the needle of "Katzen the Tiger Lady", whom he later married, and has since divorced. To date, the Enigma has had more than two hundred tattoo artists work on him, with as many as twenty-three tattoos underway at one time.

Biography

Lawrence was born in Long Beach, California, and was raised in Seattle and began studying music when he was six years old. In 1991, he got his start as a  member of the Jim Rose Circus, with which he performed around the world until 1998, touring with acts such as Nine Inch Nails, Marilyn Manson, Korn, Godsmack, and once opening for David Bowie. The Enigma then toured with Katzen, playing music and doing sideshow performances under the moniker "Human Marvels". He performed at Universal Studios Orlando's Halloween Horror Nights event in fall 2007 with Serana Rose, performing various tricks with fire, electricity, power tools and blades. He has also performed at Detroit's Theatre Bizarre.

Media appearances
The Enigma has appeared in a number of television programs including Penn & Teller: Bullshit! and The X-Files (Season 2 - episode 20 "Humbug"), where he played a character named "the Conundrum", loosely based upon himself. Palisade Toys later made a toy based on this character as part of their X-Files PALz action figure line. This character was also prominently featured on the X-Files pinball machine.

The Enigma appeared with Jim Rose on The Gong Show in 2008 performing their own chainsaw stunt known as the "kiss of death." He was also featured in the 2005 documentary film Freaky Circus Guy alongside sideshow performers Katzen, Danielle D'Meux, and William Darke.

In 2004, the Enigma appeared with Mike Patton, Jane Wiedlin, Karen Black, and Katzen in Steve Balderson's film Firecracker. He performed with Rose in a freak show act called Show Devils. In 2007, he appeared in Billy Talent's music video for their single "Fallen Leaves".

The Enigma released a DVD in 2008 with Rose directed by Robert Monson titled Electric Acid Theatre.

Additionally, the Enigma has been featured in numerous newspapers, magazines, and books. He has twice appeared in National Geographic. In 2013, he was featured on the cover of Ripley's Believe It or Not! Special Edition.

He holds a Guinness World Record for his tattoos.

References

External links

The Enigma on BMEzine

Official Website of Show Devils The Enigma's Current Touring Show

American male television actors
Sideshow performers
Pigface members
Year of birth missing (living people)
Living people
Male actors from Seattle
People known for being heavily tattooed
People known for their body modification
Ripley's Believe It or Not!